James Nelson Williams (born 1962), known by the stage name D Train (stylised as D TRAIN), is an American singer, songwriter, instrumentalist, producer and actor. He rose to fame in the early 1980s with the release of his first album “You're the One for Me” (working with songwriter/producer Hubert Eaves III initially as a duo, also called D Train), which spawned his first US Billboard Dance chart number-one hit, "You're the One for Me". His debut album (under the Prelude Records label) would also chart with the hits "Keep On" and the much covered Burt Bacharach hit "Walk on By". He would go on to work with Eaves producing hits on the follow-up albums Music and Something's on Your Mind before being signed to Columbia Records, producing the albums Miracles of the Heart and In Your Eyes. The two parted ways in 1988 and D Train went on to perform on his own label, releasing the album 701 Franklin Ave.. He is married to makeup artist, wardrobe stylist, producer, and actress Bebé Ellison.

Biography

Early life
James Nelson Williams was born in Williamsburg, Brooklyn, New York. He began singing at age 6 in the Washington Temple COGIC choir under the direction of Professors Henry and Irene Coston. He would later come under the direction of gospel singer Rev. Timothy Wright. At 10 years old, a Jackson 5 performance he saw on the Ed Sullivan Show inspired him to begin studying jazz guitar. He attended Erasmus Hall High School and played defensive tackle on the high school football team. It was here that the earned the nickname D Train after the well-known MTA Brooklyn subway line because, according to the team's captain, "When he hits you, it’s like being hit by a train".

While working on a project with his classmate, R&B singer Will Downing, D Train was introduced to musician/producer Hubert Eaves III. The duo broke out as an R&B/Dance group under the D Train name.

Music career

D Train as a band

D Train was signed to Prelude Records and their debut hit single "You're the One for Me" was released in late 1981, which reached #1 on Billboard's Dance charts and remained there for 3 weeks. The single also charted at #13 on Billboard's R&B charts and #30 in the UK's Top 100.

D Train's self-titled debut album was released in early 1982, but with the popularity of their first single, “You’re the One for Me” was adopted as the album's new title. The album produced their next hit single "Keep On", mixed by record producer François Kevorkian, which peaked at #2 on Billboard's Dance charts and #15 on Billboard's R&B charts. The album's third single, the much covered Burt Bacharach single "Walk on By", also charted in both the US and the album reached #16 on the Billboard R&B Album charts, #128 on the Pop Album charts and #72 on the UK Album charts.

D Train's second album, Music, was released in 1983. They again enjoyed chart success in both the US and the UK with their first single "Music", which peaked at #12 on the Billboard Dance charts, #20 on Billboard's R&B charts and #23 on the UK's top 100 charts. The album's third single, "Keep Giving Me Love" again proved successful on both sides of the Atlantic, charting at #24 on the Billboard Dance, #55 on the R&B charts #65 on the UK's top 100. The album peaked at #31 on the R&B Album charts.

The duo's third album, Something's on Your Mind, was released in 1984, becoming the final album the duo would release under the Prelude Records label. The title track for this album, released as the second single, became D Train's first Pop crossover success, peaking at #5 on the R&B charts and #79 on Billboard Hot 100. This album found the band branching out into new musical territory, incorporating elements of reggae and more adult-oriented R&B into their music. It included a cover of Carole King's "So Far Away."

In 1985, a remix of their debut single "You're the One for Me", featuring the work of Paul Hardcastle, was featured on a new Greatest Hits album released in the U.K. This remixed version peaked at #15 on the UK's Top 100. Meanwhile, in America, D Train entered Billboard's R&B charts again with the single “Just Another Night (Without Your Love)”, which reached #59 and preceded an American Greatest Hits album released the following year.

D Train as a solo artist
In 1986, Williams was signed by Columbia Records and released Miracles of the Heart. Although he was still collaborating with Eaves at this time, this first album for Columbia was viewed as more of a "solo" effort for Williams. The album produced several hits, including the single "Misunderstanding", which rose to #10 on the Billboard R&B/Hip Hop charts. The follow-up single, “Oh How I Love You (Girl)” went to #22 on the R&B/Hip Hop charts. The album was #51 on Billboard's R&B Albums charts.

D Train's next album, In Your Eyes was released in 1988. The title track from the album made it to #11 on the R&B/Hip Hop charts, while the follow-up single "Runner" failed to chart. The album reached #46 on the R&B Album charts.

Following the departure from Columbia and Eaves, D Train went on to pursue his own interests as a solo artist and songwriter. He would later write songs for other artists, among them were Vanessa Bell Armstrong and John P. Kee’s "Something on the Inside", Patti Austin's "I'll Be Waiting for You", George Duke's "Children of the Night" and "You Are the One in My Life" and Carl Anderson's "Children of a Lesser God".

In 2007, D Train released his sixth album 701 Franklin Ave. under his own label. The 14 track album was written and composed by himself. It included a rare live version of "Keep On".

Television and film
D Train provided vocals on the 1997 soundtrack for the film Hercules.

D Train sang the original "Pokérap", the official closing credit theme song for the anime Pokémon in 1998. The song also appeared on the show's official soundtrack. That same year, he provided backing vocals on the song "Eyes of a Child", written by Trey Parker and performed by Michael McDonald for the film South Park: Bigger, Longer & Uncut.

In 2004, "You're the One for Me" appeared on the soundtrack of the British film the Football Factory (2004).

D Train appeared on camera and performed on the soundtrack of the Amy Sedaris/Stephen Colbert film Strangers with Candy (2005).

D Train's performances of "My Funny Valentine" and Hot Chocolate's "You Sexy Thing" appeared in the Halle Berry/Bruce Willis film Perfect Stranger (2007).

Other ventures
D Train has recorded jingle vocals for commercial spots.

In 2001, SiriusXM satellite radio signed D Train to host "The D Train Show" on the Heart & Soul Channel 51 on the dial. The show was a blend of R&B music and guest interviews. Some notable guests included Lionel Richie, Roberta Flack, Jet Li, John Legend, Chaka Khan and Alicia Keys. The show ran until 2008.

Legacy
D Train's first three albums were re-released on CD in the 1990s when Unidisc Music acquired Prelude Records and several other New York dance-music labels.

In 1997, the Notorious B.I.G.'s "Sky's the Limit" sampled part of D Train's song "Keep On".

Rapper Yo-Yo's "Iz It Still All Good" sampled D-Train's "Something's on Your Mind," which featured Gerald LeVert, in 1998.

"You're the One for Me" has been remixed by Larry Levan and Shep Pettibone and most recently was sampled by DJ Kue in his 2006 hit "I Got Love". "You're the One for Me" has also been sampled in the song "Girls" by the Prodigy from their album Always Outnumbered Never Outgunned.

In 2011, Prince performed a cover of "You're the One for Me" in a live performance on George Lopez's show Lopez Tonight.

In 2013, "You're the One for Me" was featured in the release of the Rockstar Games video game Grand Theft Auto V. The game was re-released in 2014 for PlayStation 4 and Xbox One.

Discography

Solo albums

Solo singles

See also
List of Billboard number-one dance club songs
List of artists who reached number one on the U.S. Dance Club Songs chart

References

External links
 D Train 2012 Interview at Soulinterviews.com

1962 births
American boogie musicians
American funk musicians
American gospel musicians
American rhythm and blues musicians
Columbia Records artists
Erasmus Hall High School alumni
Living people
Prelude Records artists